Opelousas is a small city and the parish seat of St. Landry Parish, Louisiana, United States. Interstate 49 and U.S. Route 190 were constructed with a junction here. According to the 2020 census, Opelousas has a population of 15,786, a 6.53 percent decline since the 2010 census, which had recorded a population of 16,634. Opelousas is the principal city for the Opelousas-Eunice Micropolitan Statistical Area, which had an estimated population of 80,808 in 2020. Opelousas is also the fourth largest city in the Lafayette-Acadiana Combined Statistical Area, which has a population of 537,947.

Historically an area of settlement by French and Spanish Creoles, Creoles of color, and Acadians, Opelousas is the center of zydeco music. It celebrates its heritage at the Creoles of Color Heritage Folklife Center, one of the destinations on the new Louisiana African-American Heritage Trail. It is also the location of the Evangeline Downs Racetrack and Casino.

The city calls itself "the spice capital of the world", with production and sale of seasonings such as Tony Chachere's products, Targil Seasonings, Savoie's cajun meats and products, and LouAna Cooking Oil. 

During the tenure of Sheriff Cat Doucet, from 1936 to 1940 and again from 1952 to 1968, the section of Opelousas along Highway 190 was a haven of gambling and prostitution, the profits from which he skimmed a take.

Demographics

2020 census

As of the 2020 United States census, there were 15,786 people, 6,248 households, and 3,527 families residing in the city.

2018
According to the 2018 United States Census estimate, 16,126 people reside within the city limits of Opelousas.  The racial makeup of the city was 77.04% Black, 20.3% White, .04% Native American, .05% Asian, 0.0% Pacific Islander, .43% Other Race, 1.08% two or more races, and 1.06% was Hispanic or Latino of any race.

2010 census
The 2010 United States Census,  16,634 people resided in the city. The racial makeup of the city was 74.8% Black, 21.9% White, 0.3% Native American, 0.5% Asian, 0.0% Pacific Islander, 0.2% from some other race and 1.0% from two or more races; 1.2% was Hispanic or Latino of any race.

2000 census
As of the census of 2000, 22,860 people, 8,699 households, and 5,663 families resided in the city. The 9,783 housing units averaged 1,386.6 per square mile (535.0/km). The racial makeup of the city was 69.12% African American, 29.30% White,  0.10% Native American, 0.32% Asian, 0.02% Pacific Islander, 0.30% from other races, and 0.84% from two or more races. Hispanics or Latino of any race were 0.88% of the population. In 2000, 89.1% of the population over the age of five spoke English at home, 9.7% of the population spoke French or Cajun, and 0.7% spoke Louisiana Creole French.

Of the 8,699 households, 32.8% had children under the age of 18 living with them, 33.7% were married couples living together, 26.9% had a female householder with no husband present, and 34.9% were not families; 32.3% of all households were made up of individuals, and 15.0% had someone living alone who was 65 years of age or older. The average household size was 2.54 and the average family size was 3.24.

In the city, the population was distributed as 30.3% under the age of 18, 9.4% from 18 to 24, 24.9% from 25 to 44, 19.6% from 45 to 64, and 15.8% who were 65 years of age or older. The median age was 34 years.  For every 100 females, there were 84.0 males. For every 100 females age 18 and over, there were 77.4 males.

The median income for a household in the city was $14,717, and for a family was $19,966. Males had a median income of $24,588 versus $17,104 for females. The per capita income for the city was $9,957. About 37.7% of families and 43.1% of the population were below the poverty line, including 57.2% of those under age 18 and 32.0% of those age 65 or over.

History

Early years

Opelousas takes its name from the Native American tribe Opelousa who had occupied the area before European contact.

French traders, called coureur de bois (trapper and hunter), arrived in the Opelousas area in the early 1740s to trade with the Opelousas Indians. The French encouraged immigration to the Opelousas Post before they ceded Louisiana to Spain in 1762. An official post was established in 1764; Frenchman Louis Gérard Pellerin served as first commandant.  By 1765, Saint Landry Catholic Church was built.  In 1769, about 100 families, mostly French, were living in the post.  Don Alejandro O'Reilly, Spanish governor of Louisiana, issued a land ordinance to allow settlers in the frontier of the Opelousas Territory to acquire land grants.  However, O’Reilly forbade Acadians from settling in the Opelousas area until his successor, Luis de Unzaga, nullified that order and allowed Acadians to settle at the Opelousas.  The first official land grant was made in 1782. Numerous settlers: French, Creoles, and Acadians, mainly from the Attakapas Territory, came to the Opelousas Territory and acquired land grants.  By the mid-1780s, land was granted at the site of contemporary Opelousas.  (Some people confuse the name of this Indian tribe and territory, Opelousas, with that of the Appaloosa horse. But there is no connection; the name for the Appaloosa breed is derived from Palouse, a river named by the Nez Perce Northwestern Plains Indians.)

After the Louisiana Purchase of 1803, settlers continued to migrate here from St. Martinville. LeBon, Prejean, Thibodaux, Esprit, Nezat, Hebert, Babineaux, Mouton, and Provost were some of the early Creole families. (This use of Creole meant ethnic French and Spanish people who were born in Louisiana. Later Louisiana Creole was a term applied to anyone with French, Spanish, and Canadian ancestry.  Creoles of color were mostly assigned to mixed-race people, descended primarily from Native Americans, African-Americans, and ethnic French, with other heritage in more recent years.) Other early French Creole families were Roy, Barre, Guenard, Decuir, and Bail. In 1820, Alex Charles Barre, also a French Creole, founded Port Barre. His ancestors came from the French West Indies, probably after the revolution in which Haiti (St. Domingue) became independent. Jim Bowie and his family were said to have settled in the area circa 1813.

In 1805, Opelousas became the seat of the newly formed St. Landry Parish, also known as the Imperial Parish of Louisiana. The year 1806 marked the beginning of significant construction in Opelousas. The first courthouse was constructed in the middle of the town. Later in 1806, Louisiana Memorial United Methodist Church was founded, the first Methodist church in Louisiana. Five years later, the first St. Landry Parish Police Jury met in Opelousas, keeping minutes in the two official languages of English and French. The city was incorporated by legislative act on February 14, 1821.

American Civil War

European and American settlement was based on plantation agriculture, and both groups brought or purchased numerous enslaved Africans and African Americans to work as laborers in cotton cultivation. African Americans influenced all cultures as the people created a creolized cuisine and music. The long decline of cotton prices throughout the 19th century created economic problems, worsened by the lack of employment diversity.

In 1862, after Baton Rouge fell to the Union troops during the Civil War, Opelousas was designated the state capital for nine months. The governor's mansion in Opelousas, which was the oldest remaining governor's mansion in Louisiana, was the victim of arson on July 14, 2016, and the structure was reduced to a chimney and its foundation. The one-story mansion was located on the corner of Liberty and Grolee Streets, just west of the heart of town. An observation tower was removed from the top of the residence in the early 1900s, but the remainder of the exterior was identical to its original construction in the 1850s. The entire roof section of heavy rafters was held in place by thousands of wooden pegs; not one nail could be found in the attic. Plans had been made to restore the building to some of its former splendor. The capital was moved again in 1863, this time to Shreveport, when Union troops occupied Opelousas. During Reconstruction, the state government operated from New Orleans.

Reconstruction
After the defeat of the South and emancipation of slaves, many whites had difficulty accepting the changed conditions, especially as economic problems and dependence on agriculture slowed the South's recovery. Social tensions were high during Reconstruction. In 1868, in what is known as the Opelousas Massacre, whites killed 27 African Americans in a mass execution; they had been captured in a protest. Whites continued to attack blacks on sight for days. An estimated additional 23 to 200-300 freedmen were killed during this period. This series of murders comprised one of the single worst instances of Reconstruction violence in south Louisiana.

Following this, Opelousas in 1872 enacted ordinances that greatly restricted the freedoms of black Americans. These codes required blacks to have a written pass from their employer to enter the town and to state the duration of their visit. Blacks were not allowed on the streets after a 10 pm curfew; they could neither own a house nor reside in the town, unless they were employed by a white person, and they were not allowed in the town after 3 pm on Sundays. Like the Black Codes, such police regulations restricted the freedoms and personal autonomy of freedmen after the Civil War in the South.

Refugee era and beyond
In 1880, the railroad reached Opelousas. In the late 19th century, New York City social services agencies arranged for resettlement of Catholic orphan children by sending them to western rural areas, including Opelousas, in Louisiana and other states. At least three Orphan Trains reached this city before 1929. Opelousas is the heart of a traditional Catholic region of French, Spanish, Canadian, and French West Indian ancestry. Catholic families in Louisiana took in more than 2,000 mostly Catholic orphans to live in their rural farming communities.

In the year 1920, segregation at St Landry Catholic Church led local Black Catholics to establish their own parish, Holy Ghost. It has since grown to become the largest Black parish in the United States.

In May 1927, Opelousas accepted thousands of refugees following the Great Mississippi Flood of 1927 in the Mississippi Delta. Heavy rains in northern and midwestern areas caused intense flooding in areas of Mississippi, Arkansas, and Louisiana downstream, especially after levées near Moreauville, Cecilia, and Melville collapsed.

More than 81% of St. Landry Parish suffered some flooding, with 77% of the inhabitants directly affected. People in more southern areas of Louisiana, especially those communities along Bayou Teche, were forced to flee their homes for areas that suffered less damage. By May 20, over 5,700 refugees were registered in Opelousas, which had a population of only 6,000 people. Many of the refugees later returned to their homes and began the rebuilding process.

During the tenure of Parish Sheriff Cat Doucet from 1936 to 1940 and 1952 to 1968, the section of Opelousas along Highway 190 was a haven of gambling and prostitution. Doucet told historian Michael Kurtz that, with the return of Earl Long to the governorship in 1956, Doucet could bring back brothels and casinos and get a take of the proceeds.

Festivals
The annual Yambilee Festival in Opelousas began in 1946.  The harvest festival took place on the last weekend in October. Activities included agricultural competitions, carnival rides, pageants, and parades with floats.  John F. Kennedy once attended. The festival has since been cancelled.

Since 1982, Opelousas has hosted the Original Southwest Louisiana Zydeco Festival. Usually held the Saturday before Labor Day at Zydeco Park in Plaisance, the festival features a day of performances by Zydeco musicians, with the goal of keeping the genre alive.Additional annual events include:
 Annual Gumbo Cook-off - January
 Holy Ghost Festival - first weekend of November, near All Saints Day (Nov. 1)
 Christmas Lighting of Le Vieux Village- first Friday every December

 Opelousas Imperial Mardi Gras Parade- Mardi Gras (Tuesday before Ash Wednesday in French Catholic tradition)
 Opelousas Mardi Gras Celebration/Street Dance on Court St.- Mardi Gras

Education
Opelousas is home to several public and private schools. Opelousas has many public high schools, which are Opelousas Senior High, Northwest High School, and Magnet Academy for Cultural Arts. Opelousas Junior High serves as the area middle school. The city has seven public elementary schools. It is also home to one of the campuses of South Louisiana Community College.

The private schools are religiously based, including Opelousas Catholic School, Westminster Christian Academy, Apostolic Christian Academy, New Hope Christian Academy, and Family Worship Christian Academy.

Media
Opelousas is part of the Lafayette television and radio markets.

The city is home to KOCZ-LP, a low power community radio station owned and operated by the Southern Development Foundation. The station was built by numerous volunteers from Opelousas and around the country at the third Prometheus Radio Project barnraising. 

KOCZ broadcasts music, news, and public affairs to listeners now at 92.9. It was originally on 103.7, but had to move due to a full-power station being licensed to 103.7. Opelousas is home to The Mix KOGM 107.1FM, which is owned by KSLO Broadcasting, Inc.

There are two TV stations based in Opelousas, KDCG-CD (Class A Digital) TV Channel 22 and K39JV, another low power on channel 39.

Economy
The primary industries in Opelousas are agriculture, oil, manufacturing, wholesale, and retail.

The horse racing track Evangeline Downs relocated to Opelousas from its former home in Carencro, Louisiana, in 2003. It employs over 600 workers. 

Opelousas is also home to Tony Chachere, a Louisiana spice company with a worldwide reach. The company makes a variety of seasoning blends, sauces, marinades, and other products.

In September 1999, Wal-Mart opened a large distribution center just north of the city. It is generating an $89 million impact per year to the area, employing over 600 full-time workers.

Sports
Opelousas was home to the Opelousas Indians, a minor league baseball franchise that was based in Opelousas in 1907, 1932 and 1934–1941. The Indians were members of the Gulf Coast League (1907) and Evangeline League (1934–1941). The team played at Elementary School Park. The Opelousas Orphans played a portion of the 1932 season in the Cotton States League. Opelousas was an affiliate of the Cleveland Indians (1935–1937, 1939).

Notable people

Athletes
 Rod Milburn, 1972 Summer Olympics gold medalist
 Lloyd Mumphord, NFL cornerback and special-teams captain for Miami Dolphins during their perfect season (1972–73), two-time Super Bowl champion
 Marvin White, safety for the Cincinnati Bengals
 Devery Henderson, wide receiver for the New Orleans Saints
 CeeDee Lamb, wide receiver for the Dallas Cowboys
 Daniel Baldridge, offensive tackle for the Jacksonville Jaguars and the Tennessee Titans

Clergy
 W. C. Friley, Baptist clergyman who, through a series of revival meetings in 1880, helped to establish First Baptist Church Opelousas.
 Dominic Carmon, Roman Catholic bishop
 Charles Michael Jarrell, Roman Catholic bishop

Culinary
 Chef Tony Chachere was born in Opelousas; the town is home to his company, Tony Chachere Creole Foods.
 Chef Paul Prudhomme
 Eula Savoie owner and operator of Savoie Cajun Foods.

Entertainers
 Rod Bernard, American singer who helped to pioneer the musical genre known as "swamp pop", which combined New Orleans-style rhythm and blues, country and western, and Cajun music.
Tex Brashear, voice-over/cartoon voice actor
 Clifton Chenier, legendary zydeco musician
 Richard Eastham (1916–2005), actor
 Mabel Sonnier Savoie, American singer, guitarist

Historians
 Winston De Ville, Colonial Louisiana and Mississippi Valley historian, genealogist, and author
 Carl Brasseaux, historian of French Colonial Louisiana

Politicians
 Cindy Courville, first US Ambassador to the African Union
 Jay Dean, mayor of Longview, Texas, 2005–2015; Republican member of the Texas House of Representatives, was born in Opelousas in 1953.
 Cat Doucet, Sheriff of St. Landry Parish, 1936–40; 1952–68
 Gilbert L. Dupré, state representative and district court judge for St. Landry Parish
 H. Garland Dupré, state representative and U.S. representative for Louisiana's 2nd congressional district in New Orleans, was born in Opelousas in 1873.
 Jacques Dupré, 8th Governor of Louisiana; fought in Battle of New Orleans, and served as a state politician from 1816 to 1848. Owned the largest ranch in Louisiana in 1830.
 Ivan L. R. Lemelle, Federal Judge, U.S. District Court, Eastern District of Louisiana, and former U.S. Magistrate Judge of the same district.
Charles Nash, African American Republican Representative after during the Reconstruction era
 André B. Roman, 9th Governor of Louisiana serving two non-consecutive terms. Speaker of the Louisiana House of Representatives, 1822 to 1826. State politician from 1818 to 1843.
 Louisiana Chief Justice Albert Tate, Jr., who later served on the United States Fifth Circuit Court of Appeals, based in New Orleans.

Others
 Jim Bowie, legendary adventurer and hero of the Alamo, lived in Opelousas for a time.
 Rezin Bowie, older brother of Alamo hero Jim Bowie and inventor of the famous Bowie knife, lived in Opelousas and married and converted to Catholicism at St. Landry Catholic Church in Opelousas.
 Confederate Brigadier General J.J. Alfred Mouton, CSA, was born in Opelousas on February 29, 1829; he served under Confederate General Richard Taylor, and was killed during the Battle of Mansfield, Louisiana.
 Bobby Dunbar, noted kidnap victim
 Antoinette Frank, death-row inmate at the Louisiana Correctional Institute
 Georgia Ann Robinson, first African American woman to serve as an officer in the Los Angeles Police Department
 Summrs, rapper and progenitor of the pluggnb subgenre

In popular culture
Musician Billy Cobham recorded a song called "Opelousas" on his 1978 album Simplicity of Expression - Depth of Thought (Columbia Records JC 35457).

The 1980s synthpop musician Thomas Dolby mentions Opelousas in the song "I Love You Goodbye" from his 1992 album Astronauts & Heretics. The narrator of the song describes being arrested by a sheriff who offers to let him go in exchange for a bribe, under the guise of a contribution to the town's charity ball. 

The folk-rock singer Lucinda Williams mentions Opelousas in the song "Concrete and Barbed Wire" from her critically acclaimed album Car Wheels on a Gravel Road. Singer-songwriter and comedian Henry Phillips mentions Opelousas as one of the venues in his song "I'm In Minneapolis (You're In Hollywood)"'.

References

Further reading

External links

 

 
Cities in Louisiana
Louisiana
Cities in St. Landry Parish, Louisiana
Parish seats in Louisiana
Louisiana African American Heritage Trail
Populated places established in 1720
1720 establishments in the French colonial empire